Eclose-Badinières is a commune in the Isère department in southeastern France. It was created in January 2015 by the merger of Eclose and Badinières.

See also
Communes of the Isère department

References

Communes of Isère